Janice "Jan" Melbourne Merrill (born June 18, 1956) is a retired American runner.  She was the dominant long distance runner of the middle 1970s, a notable front runner, her uniform with the large "M" on her chest would usually break away to an insurmountable lead in domestic meets.  She was equally untouchable in self-promotion or dealing with the media, often deferring to her coach, Norm Higgins.  At various points in time she held the American record  in the 1500 meters (4:02.61 set on July 29, 1976) during the 1976 Summer Olympics in Montreal, the 3,000 meters and 5,000 meters.  She lost other record opportunities because the only times she could get a decent race in the United States was against men.

She won the U.S. title at 1500 meters twice outdoors, 3000 meters 4 times, twice in the indoor mile, twice in the indoor 2 mile and twice in Cross Country. After retiring from competitions she became a high school and college track coach.

Achievements

References

1956 births
Living people
Sportspeople from New London, Connecticut
Track and field athletes from Connecticut
American female middle-distance runners
American female long-distance runners
American female cross country runners
Athletes (track and field) at the 1975 Pan American Games
Athletes (track and field) at the 1976 Summer Olympics
Athletes (track and field) at the 1979 Pan American Games
Olympic track and field athletes of the United States
Pan American Games gold medalists for the United States
Pan American Games medalists in athletics (track and field)
Medalists at the 1975 Pan American Games
Medalists at the 1979 Pan American Games
20th-century American women